Real/Fake Princess is a historical romance manhua comic series written and illustrated by Yi Huan. It was published in Taiwan by Tong Li Comics and distributed in the United States by DrMaster.

Characters
Zhi Li- A

Plot
Real/Fake Princess is set during the Jin Rebellions of China's Song Dynasty. Fearing for her child's safety, the mother of infant Princess Yi Fu gives the child to a commoner, who then escapes with the baby to safety. Ten years later, peace is restored and the ruling house issues and edict to find the missing princess. Then the search advisor, Wu Zhong Lu, was confronted with a peasant girl with her guardian, Tan Hui. The peasant girl is then found out to be the missing princess, but goes by a different name. That name was given to her by Tan Hui it is called, Zhi Li. It means "separation". The girl does not wish to be a princess for it would mean being separated from her one-sided love for Hui. However, Wu Zhong Lu, gives in and promises her to restore Hui's status back up to a higher status so she could see him again. After many trials and fights between the two, it is seen that they both are falling in love with each other. Wu Zhong Lu's prostitute, Dai Xuan, is also in love with Wu Zhong, but notices that he has fallen hard for the princess.

Comic
Real/Fake Princess was published in five volumes by Tong Li Comics in Taiwan, between 2002 and 2003. Extras included detailed historical notes and character profiles by Yi. The series was translated into English and distributed by DrMaster from 2006 to 2007. English translation was provided by Yun Zhao, with the adaptation by Ailen Lujo. The series has also been released in Thai by Burapat Comics as Princess of Zung Dynasty (องค์หญิงกำมะลอ), Vietnamese by Nhà Xuất Bản Trẻ as Công Chúa Lac Loài, and Hungarian by Delta Vision as Makrancos hercegnő.

References

Further reading

External links
 Real/Fake Princess @ DrMaster
 Real/Fake Princess @ Tong Li

Historical comics
Romance comics
Tong Li Publishing titles
2002 comics debuts
Comics set in the 12th century
Comics set in the 13th century